Lavi (Lawi; autonym: Swoeng or səlwəŋ) is a Mon–Khmer language of the Bahnaric branch spoken in Sekong Province, Laos. Chazée (1999:95) estimates the population at 500, while the 2015 Laotian census places the Lavi population at 1,215.

The Lavi language was discovered by Thai linguist Therapan L-Thongkum in the late 1990s. Within the West Bahnaric branch, it is the most divergent language (Sidwell 2003). Lavi speakers reside in the village Ban Lavi (also called Ban Fandeng), which is about 8 km south of the city of Sekong. Speakers can also be found in Laongam in Salavan province, Paksong in Champasak province, and Thateng in Sekong province. 

Applying for an iso 639-3 code in 2018.

References

Further reading
Bradley, David (2007). Languages of Mainland South-East Asia. In The Vanishing Languages of the Pacific Rim. Oxford University Press. Oxford and New York. p. 317.
Sidwell, Paul (2003). A Handbook of comparative Bahnaric, Vol. 1: West Bahnaric. Pacific Linguistics, 551. Canberra: Research School of Pacific and Asian Studies, Australian National University.
L-Thongkum, Theraphan. (1997). The place of Lawi, Harak and Tariang within Bahnaric. Mon-Khmer Studies Journal vol. p.109-117.
L-Thongkum, Theraphan. (2001). Languages of the Tribes in Xekong Province Southern Laos. The Thailand Research Fund. (In Thai, see pages 399-400 for information on Lavi's sound system).

Bahnaric languages
Languages of Laos